Taylor Elise Bagley (born September 9, 1987) is an American model and actress.

Early life
Bagley was born on September 9, 1987, in Oklahoma (city unknown) to Robert and Donna. She has one older sister, Erin. She spent part of her childhood in Broken Arrow, Oklahoma and attended Centennial High School in Franklin, Tennessee. Although being born in Oklahoma, Bagley states in interviews that she considers herself a Nashville, Tennessee, native.

Career
Bagley is signed to the Wilhelmina Models agency in London. She is also signed to Ford Models (New York)  and Vision Los Angeles. She has appeared in editorials for Vogue Italia. In 2013, she appeared as the angel in La Passione, James Franco's short film for Gucci. In 2014, she made a small appearance in her then-boyfriend Zach Braff's movie "Wish I Was Here" as a cosplayer. In 2015, she participated in Interpol's music video "Everything is Wrong".

Personal life
Bagley was in a relationship with actor/director Zach Braff from 2009 to 2014. She was in a relationship with the frontman of the rock band Arctic Monkeys, Alex Turner from 2015 to early 2018.

References

1987 births
Living people
Female models from Oklahoma
21st-century American women